Alyssa Tirtosentono (born 29 May 2000) is a Dutch badminton player. She won a silver medal at the 2018 European Junior Championships.

Career 
Tirtosentono came from a badminton family, who have a Surinamese Javanese background. She started to playing badminton with her late grandfather, Press, who was a badminton coach and veteran champion, while her late father, Steven, was also a player and a huge badminton fan. At the age of 17, she started training in the NSF Sportcentrum Papendal, where she now lives. In the Dutch Eredivisie league Alyssa is playing for the club Dropshot, after a long career at her former club DKC in the Hague, while in Denmark she plays competition for Team Skælskør - Slagelse (TSS). She is also head trainer for the badminton club Appoldro in Apeldoorn, trainer at Badminton Club Phido in Doetinchem and once a week trainer of the juniors at Wageningen in the Netherlands. 

Her specialty is in the doubles events, where together with her current doubles partner Imke van der Aar she won the Spanish International 2021 and reached the semi-finals of the Dutch Open 2021.

Achievements

European Junior Championships 
Mixed doubles

BWF International Challenge/Series (5 titles, 3 runners-up) 
Women's doubles

Mixed doubles

  BWF International Challenge tournament
  BWF International Series tournament
  BWF Future Series tournament

BWF Junior International (3 titles) 
Girls' doubles

  BWF Junior International Grand Prix tournament
  BWF Junior International Challenge tournament
  BWF Junior International Series tournament
  BWF Junior Future Series tournament

References

External links 
 

2000 births
Living people
Sportspeople from The Hague
Dutch people of Javanese descent
Dutch female badminton players
21st-century Dutch women